Soltan Moradi (also Romanized as Solţān Morādī) is a village in Gel-e Sefid Rural District, in the Central District of Langarud County, Gilan Province, Iran. At the 2006 census, its population was 278, in 92 families.

References 

Populated places in Langarud County